-dimensional manufacturing , also known as -D, is a conventional way of describing a process for obtaining an object where the third dimension is somehow dependent from the transversal cross-section of the same.

-D is used for differentiating a 3D process, like for example injection moulding, casting or forging, as well as 2D processes like plastics extrusion, extrusion, drawing or dipping from other processes, like for example microextrusion, overmoulding, etc.

The product of the -D process can, in fact, be described by mean of a transversal cross-section and a longitudinal cross-section as any other, but in which the transversal cross-section varies, generating a variable longitudinal cross-section generally more simple than the transversal cross-section.

In other words, the third dimension, so the longitudinal cross-section can be represented as the projection of the transversal cross-section in the infinity of the horizon.  

An example of -D processing, can be -D microextrusion, where, thanks to an optimal control of the process, the obtained extrudate, which is generally, but not always a tube, can have:
 Tapered profile, which means that diameters or characteristic dimensions, varies independently from each other.
 Bump profile, which means that dimensions will vary in a dependent way, so the dimensions will be proportional.
 TIE (Totally Intermittent Extrusion) profile, which means that at least one of the materials composing the cross-section switch to another allowing a variation of hardness, radio-opacity or other specific characteristics.
 ILE (Intermittent Layer Extrusion) profile, which means that the materials composing the cross-section can vary the proportion between themselves, in case of a tube for example, the thickness of one layer can change independently from others.

References

Bibliography

Dimension
Molding processes